Carabus alexandrae subidolon is a subspecies of beetle in the family Carabidae that is endemic to Gansu, China.

References

alexandrae subidolon
Beetles described in 1994
Beetles of Asia
Endemic fauna of Gansu